The following lists events that happened during 2014 in the Hellenic Republic.

Incumbents

Events

May
 May 5 – At least two people are dead and 30 missing after two boats carrying illegal immigrants collide in the Aegean Sea off the coast of Greece.
 May 24 – The 6.4  Aegean Sea earthquake shook the area with a maximum Mercalli intensity of VIII (Severe), causing 324 injuries and $450 million in damage.
 May 25 – Greece votes in European and second-round local elections.

November
 November 27 – Greek labor unions begin a general strike to protest ongoing government austerity measures shutting down public medical, educational, and transportational services.

December
 December 5 – The British Museum announces that it will loan one of the Elgin Marbles in its collection, originally taken from Greece, to the Hermitage Museum in Saint Petersburg. Greece's Prime Minister Antonis Samaras calls the move "a provocation to the Greek people."
 December 23 – The Greek parliament fails to elect a new president in the second round of voting.
 December 28 – The Italian-owned MS Norman Atlantic catches fire on a ferry run from Greece to Italy 44 nautical miles northwest of Corfu, with 222 vehicles, 411 passengers and 5 crew on board. Greek and Italian officials report at least one person is dead.
 December 29 – Snap elections are to be called after the Hellenic Parliament fails to elect a new Greek president.

Deaths

17 May  – Anna Pollatou, rhythmic gymnast (born 1983)

See also
 Greek legislative election, January 2015
 Cabinet of Antonis Samaras

References

 
Greece
2010s in Greece
Greece
Years of the 21st century in Greece